The MTV Video Music Award for Best Male Video was one of four original general awards that have been handed out every year since the first MTV Video Music Awards in 1984. In 2007, though, the award was briefly renamed Male Artist of the Year, and it awarded the artist's whole body of work for that year rather than a specific video. However, the award returned to its original name the following year. It was replaced by the Artist of the Year category in 2017, combining Best Male and Best Female video categories.

With three victories, Eminem is the artist with most wins in this category, and also has the most nominations with nine. Meanwhile, Tom Petty, Beck, Will Smith, Justin Timberlake and Chris Brown, all have won this twice, with the first three being the only artists to win the award for two consecutive years.

Recipients

Records/stats

Most Wins:
1. Eminem: 3 wins
2. Justin Timberlake, Will Smith, Beck, Tom Petty, Chris Brown: 2 wins
Most Nominated Artist, as of 2016 (Including nominations for Male Artist of the Year)
Despite as a female artist on this category, Rihanna has been nominated six times with two wins.

References

See also 
 MTV Europe Music Award for Best Male

 
MTV Video Music Awards
Awards established in 1984
Awards disestablished in 2016